Sané is a surname. Notable persons with this surname include:
 Abdoulaye Sané (born 1992), Senegalese footballer
 Ibrahima Sané (born 1989), Senegalese footballer
 Ismaila Sané (born 1956), Senegalese musician
 Jacques-Noël Sané (1740–1831), French naval engineer
 Landing Sané (born 1990), French basketball player
 Leroy Sané (born 1996), German footballer
 Ludovic Sané (born 1987), Senegalese footballer
 Pape Sané (born 1990), Senegalese footballer
 Salif Sané(born 1990), Senegalese footballer
 Souleyman Sané (born 1961), Senegalese footballer
 Tidiane Sane (born 1985), Senegalese footballer
 Vieux Sané (born 1989), Senegalese footballer